Bruce Lalombongo (born 29 April 1990 in Brazzaville) is a Swiss footballer who currently plays for Yverdon Sport in the Swiss Super League.

Career
Lalombongo began his career 1999 with FC Renens and joined after four years to the youth team of Lausanne Sports. He was the subject of a transfer tug of war between Real Madrid and Everton F.C. and was all set to join Everton in April 2007 but opted to remain in Switzerland to focus on his studies. He signed after the failed transfer to England with Grasshopper Club Zürich in summer 2007. In summer 2010 signed for Yverdon Sport.

References

1990 births
Living people
Swiss men's footballers
Switzerland youth international footballers
Sportspeople from Brazzaville
FC Lausanne-Sport players
Grasshopper Club Zürich players
Yverdon-Sport FC players
Republic of the Congo emigrants to Switzerland
Association football midfielders